Prince Gustaf Adolf, Duke of Västerbotten (Gustaf Adolf Oscar Fredrik Arthur Edmund; 22 April 1906 – 26 January 1947) was a Swedish prince who for most of his life was second in the line of succession to the Swedish throne. He was the eldest son of Gustaf VI Adolf, who was crown prince for most of his son's life and ascended the Swedish throne three years after his son's death. The current king, Carl XVI Gustaf, is Prince Gustaf Adolf's son. The prince was killed on 26 January 1947 in an airplane crash at Kastrup Airport, Copenhagen, Denmark.

Early life

Gustaf Adolf was born in Stockholm on 22 April 1906 as the eldest son of the then Prince Gustaf Adolf and his first wife Princess Margaret. He was known by his last given name, Edmund, in the family.

Gustaf Adolf passed studentexamen at Stockholm Palace in 1925 and attended the Cavalry Officer Candidate School (Kavalleriets officersaspirantskola, KavOAS) in Eksjö the following year and in 1926–1927 the Royal Military Academy. He was then commissioned as fänrik in the Svea Life Guards (I 1) and the Life Regiment Dragoons (K 2) and in 1928 in the Life Regiment of Horse (K 1). Gustaf Adolf continued his military training and became major in the General Staff Corps, Svea Life Guards, and the Life Regiment of Horse in 1941 In 1943, he became lieutenant colonel in the General Staff Corps, in Svea Life Guards, in Västerbotten Regiment and in the Swedish Cavalry. He was lieutenant colonel at his death.

Interests and royal duties

Gustaf Adolf, who served as president of the Swedish Olympic Committee from 1933 until his death in 1947, had competed in show jumping at the 1936 Summer Olympics.

Gustaf Adolf joined the Boy Scouts, and as an adult became a Scoutmaster. He earned his Wood Badge beads at Gilwell Park in England. When the Svenska Scoutrådet formed he served as its first president or Chief Scout. He led the Swedish contingents at the 5th World Scout Jamboree in 1937 and at the World Scout Moot in 1939. He served on the World Scout Committee from May 1937 until his death.

From 1932, Prince Gustaf Adolf was chairman of the Swedish Scout Council and from 1937 honorary chairman of the International Scout Committee. Since 1933, the prince was also chairman of the Central Board of the Swedish Sports Confederation, the Swedish Central Association for Sports Promotion (Centralföreningen för idrottens främjande) and the Swedish Olympic Committee. Prince Gustaf Adolf was chairman of the Royal Swedish Aero Club from 1937 and the Royal Automobile Club from 1939. He was first honorary member of the Swedish Central Federation for Voluntary Military Training (Centralförbundet för Befälsutbildning), of the Royal Society of Sciences in Uppsala, of the Royal Swedish Academy of War Sciences, of the Royal Swedish Academy of Music, of the Royal Swedish Society of Naval Sciences and honorary member of the Royal Swedish Academy of Sciences. He was also honorary chairman of the Central Organization of the Swedish Women’s Auxiliary Veterinary Corps (Centralstyrelsen för Svenska blå stjärnan).

World War II

As an official representative of Sweden, Gustaf Adolf met with many Nazi leaders, including Adolf Hitler and Hermann Göring, which has led to speculations about possible Nazi sympathies. Though his father-in-law, Charles Edward, the deposed Duke of Saxe-Coburg and Gotha, was a Nazi, the subject remains a matter of speculation. In his book Alla dessa Bernadottar (All these Bernadottes), Staffan Skott asserts that letters and diary entries by influential anti-Nazi Swedes disprove the rumors. The Swedish Royal Court made a statement denying any knowledge of Nazi sympathies.

Gustaf Adolf expressed his support for Finland during the Continuation War of 1941–1944, and would even have liked to participate as a voluntary soldier in the Winter War of 1939–1940, but the King's disapproval prevented this from happening.

Some leading Swedish politicians were averse to the possibility of seeing Gustaf Adolf inherit the throne, and one prominent Social Democrat publicly uttered that the prince was "a person who must never be King".

Marriage and family

On 20 October 1932 at St. Moritz Church in Coburg, Gustaf Adolf married his second cousin, Princess Sibylla of Saxe-Coburg and Gotha, daughter of Charles Edward, former Duke of Saxe-Coburg and Gotha. They had five children: Princess Margaretha, Mrs. Ambler (born 31 October 1934); Princess Birgitta of Sweden (born 19 January 1937); Princess Désirée, Baroness Silfverschiöld (born 2 June 1938); Princess Christina, Mrs. Magnuson (born 3 August 1943); and King Carl XVI Gustaf of Sweden (born 30 April 1946).

Death

Gustaf Adolf was killed in an airplane crash in the afternoon of 26 January 1947 at Kastrup Airport, Copenhagen, Denmark. The prince, along with two companions, was returning to Stockholm from a hunting trip and visit to Princess Juliana and Prince Bernhard of the Netherlands. The delayed KLM flight from Amsterdam had landed at Copenhagen for a routine stop before continuing to Stockholm. Soon after the Douglas DC-3 aircraft took off, it climbed to an altitude of about 50 meters (150 ft), stalled, and plummeted nose-first to the ground, where it exploded on impact. All 22 people aboard the plane (16 passengers and six crew members) were killed. Also aboard the ill-fated flight was American singer and actress Grace Moore and Danish actress Gerda Neumann. An investigation found that an inexperienced young employee had serviced the aircraft and, short of time, the plane's captain had failed to perform the final pre-flight check list properly. He took off not realizing that elevator locking pins were still in place.

At the time of his death, Gustaf Adolf had been second in line to the Swedish throne behind his father, the crown prince, who in 1950 became King Gustaf VI Adolf. The younger Gustaf Adolf was succeeded as second in line by his only son, Carl Gustaf (at the time only 9 months old), who would later succeed his grandfather in 1973 as King Carl XVI Gustaf.

Honours and arms

Military ranks

  1927: Fänrik in the Svea Life Guards and the Life Regiment Dragoons
  1928: Fänrik in the Life Regiment of Horse
  1941: Major in the General Staff Corps, Svea Life Guards, and the Life Regiment of Horse
  1943: Lieutenant Colonel in the General Staff Corps, Svea Life Guards, Västerbotten Regiment, and in the Swedish Cavalry

Honours

Orders
  1906: Knight and Commander of the Orders of His Majesty the King (Knight of the Royal Order of the Seraphim)
  1906: Commander Grand Cross of the Order of the Sword
  1906: Commander Grand Cross of the Order of the Polar Star
  1906: Crown Prince Gustaf V and Crown Princess Silver Wedding Medal
  1907: King Oscar II and Queen Sofia's Golden Wedding Medal
  25 May 1928: King Gustaf V's Jubilee Commemorative Medal
  ?: Knight of the Order of Charles XIII

Foreign honours

  Grand Cordon of the Order of Leopold
  Knight of the Order of the Elephant
  Order of the Cross of the Eagle, 1st class
  Grand Cross of the Order of the White Rose of Finland
  First Class of the Order of the Cross of Liberty with swords, oak leaf and star
  Order of Merit of the Republic of Hungary
  Knight Grand Cross of the Order of the Netherlands Lion
  Grand Cross of the Order of St. Olav with Collar
  Grand Cross of the Saxe-Ernestine House Order
  Honorary Knight Grand Cross of the Royal Victorian Order

Arms
The arms of Prince Gustaf Adolf were those of the Kingdom of Sweden, with a quarter with the arms of Västerbotten in base.

Ancestry

References

External links

 The Swedish Royal Court

Gustav 1906
House of Bernadotte
Dukes of provinces of Sweden
Swedish Lutherans
Swedish people of World War II
1906 births
1947 deaths
World Scout Committee members
Victims of aviation accidents or incidents in Denmark
Scouting and Guiding in Sweden
Swedish people of British descent
Swedish people of German descent
Burials at Kungliga begravningsplatsen
Swedish people of French descent
People from Stockholm
Olympic equestrians of Sweden
Swedish male equestrians
Equestrians at the 1936 Summer Olympics
Victims of aviation accidents or incidents in 1947
Members of the Royal Swedish Academy of War Sciences
Members of the Royal Swedish Society of Naval Sciences
Members of the Royal Swedish Academy of Sciences
Members of the Royal Swedish Academy of Music
Sons of kings
Knights of the Order of Charles XIII
Commanders Grand Cross of the Order of the Sword
Commanders Grand Cross of the Order of the Polar Star
Recipients of the Order of the Netherlands Lion
Honorary Knights Grand Cross of the Royal Victorian Order